Pristimantis nigrogriseus is a species of frog in the family Strabomantidae.
It is endemic to Ecuador.
Its natural habitats are tropical moist montane forests and rivers.
It is threatened by habitat loss.

References

nigrogriseus
Endemic fauna of Ecuador
Amphibians of Ecuador
Amphibians of the Andes
Amphibians described in 1945
Taxonomy articles created by Polbot